San Cristóbal de Segovia is a town of around 3000 inhabitants in Spain, a few kilometers south east of the city of Segovia.

The town is first mentioned in 1247.

References

Municipalities in the Province of Segovia
Talones de geografía de la provincia de Segovia
Populated places in the Province of Segovia